Yi-Liu, sometimes called Yichun after its principal dialect, is one of the Gan Chinese languages. It is spoken in Yichun in Jiangxi province and in Liuyang in Hunan, after which it is named, as well as in Shanggao, Qingjiang, Xingan, Xinyu City, Fen yi, Pingxiang City, Fengcheng, Wanzai in Jiangxi and in Liling in Hunan.

Sounds
The Yichun variety will be taken as representative.

Consonants

Tones

References

Gan Chinese